Seis Lagos is a gated community and census-designated place (CDP) in Collin County, Texas, United States. It was first listed as a CDP prior to the 2020 census.

The Seis Lagos Community is located in Lucas, Texas, but outside the city municipality, in the extraterritorial jurisdiction. The State designates certain areas as the extraterritorial jurisdiction of municipalities to promote and protect the general health, safety, and welfare of persons residing in and adjacent to the municipalities.

It is in the southern part of the county, bordered to the north, west, and south by the city limits of Lucas. As suggested by the name, six lakes have been built into the rolling terrain of the community.

History 
Seis Lagos was developed by the original “JR” the owner of Sothfork Ranch. Joe Duncan built his family home in 1970 and the home and ranch were featured in the 80's television show "Dallas".
Seis Lagos was developed by Joe Duncan with Duncan Developments.
The original advertisements read. Seis Lagos “The Closet Thing To The City You’ll Ever Want The Country To Be”

Seis Lagos Today

Urban comforts in a country setting 
This upscale residential community is warm and welcoming and filling up with happy residents who have found what they’ve been looking for;  space,  fresh air,  good neighbors,  excellent schools, top-notch security and a wealth of activities and amenities —all placed around six lovely lakes that are ours to enjoy.

. . .  Almost heaven!

spacious, secure, scenic, sociable, and family-oriented

 Home-sites vary from 1/2 acre to 1 or more acre.  The Seis Lagos Utility District provides concrete roads, water and sewer service to the community.
 Phase I contains 199 homes. This phase was completed in the mid-1990s. 
 Phase II added 57 homes in 2001.
 Phase III, in 2001, added 71 home-sites on 55 acres centered around Hidden Lake, in southeastern Seis Lagos.
 Phase IV contains about 70 homes located along the southern region of Seis Lagos. 

The residents of Seis Lagos have a full schedule of year-round activities that appeal to everyone from 1 to 91, including a full-blown Independence Day celebration with a great parade. 

There is a multitude of amenities -- the excellent fishing in our six lakes, plus lighted tennis courts and three swimming pools with a pool cabana -- plus a stylish clubhouse for everything from weddings to meetings to a game of cards.

Here are some of the activites you can enjoy in Seis Lagos. Move here, and be part of the fun. 

 4th of July celebration and parade!
 Fishing tournament
 Children’s Halloween party
 Children’s Santa party
 Easter egg hunt
 Poker & other card clubs
 Bunko
 Swimming
 Tennis
 Volleyball

References 

Populated places in Collin County, Texas
Census-designated places in Collin County, Texas
Census-designated places in Texas